Nelo may also refer to:

Nelo (moth), a genus of moths in the family Geometridae
Nelo (band), an alternative rock band
Nelo (canoes), a canoe and kayak manufacturer

People 
Nelo Vingada (born 1953), Portuguese football manager
Nelo Risi (1920–2015), Italian poet and film director
Nelo (Portuguese footballer) (born 1967)